Home and Away is an Australian soap opera. It was first broadcast on the Seven Network on 17 January 1988. The following is a list of characters that first appeared in the Australian soap opera Home and Away in 2006, by order of first appearance. They were all introduced by the show's series producer Julie McGuaran. The 19th season of Home and Away began airing on the Seven Network on 16 January 2006 and concluded on 1 December 2006. The first introduction of year was Amy Mathews as Rachel Armstrong in the year's premiere. Jessica Tovey joined the cast as Belle Taylor in February. Sam North began portraying Dom Moran in April. Rodger Corser and Trent Baines also joined the cast as Doctor Hugh Sullivan and Macca MacKenzie respectively. In July, Bobby Morley arrived as Drew Curtis and Chris Sadrinna was cast as Rachel's brother Brad Armstrong. October marked the introductions of Jessica Chapnik as Sam Tolhurst, her son Rory Tolhurst and the Cooper brothers Rocco and Johnny played by Ian Meadows and Callan Mulvey.

Rachel Armstrong

Rachel Armstrong, played by Amy Mathews debuted on-screen during the episode airing on 16 January 2006. In 2010, Mathews quit the serial to pursue other projects and her on-screen husband Tony Holden was also written out. 
The serial's official website describe Rachel stating: "She has great instincts for people and has a sharp mind; she’s fiercely independent and has great strength of character." Of Rachel's persona, Mathews states: "Rachel is outgoing and fun with a sharp mind and good instincts for people. She has incredible strength and is fiercely independent. She has strong values and definite ideas about right and wrong but she is also a romantic at heart." 
In 2007, Mathews received the Logie for "New Female Talent" for her portrayal of Rachel. Mathews was nominated for "Best Actress" and "Best Couple" for her relationship with Kim at the 2007 Inside Soap Awards. Soap opera reporting website Holy Soap describe Rachel's most memorable moment as: "Being taken hostage by the Believers cult, who tried to force her to deliver Tasha's baby."

Belle Taylor

Susan "Belle" Taylor, played by Jessica Tovey, made her first on-screen appearance on 3 February 2006. Belle's storylines included finding her birth mother, a drug addiction, her relationship with Aden Jefferies and being diagnosed with cancer. In 2009, it was announced that Tovey had quit the show and the writers took the decision to kill off the character. Belle made her last appearance on 11 August 2009. Tovey joined Home and Away in 2006 when she was 18. The character of Belle was her first television role. In April 2009, Tovey announced that she had quit Home and Away. RTÉ's website describes Belle as being a "cheeky, extroverted young girl". She was full of insecurity from her "disciplined and controlling" upbringing. She craved love and attention from her parents, which they never gave to her. Belle's parents were shocked to discover their daughter was rejecting their conservative lifestyle and hanging out with the wrong crowd. Tovey earned various award nominations for her role as Belle. In 2007, Tovey earned a nomination for "Most Popular New Female Talent" at the Logie Awards. In 2010, she was nominated for "Most Popular Actress". At the 2007 Inside Soap Awards, Tovey was nominated for "Sexiest Female". In 2009, she received a nomination for "Best Actress" and "Best Storyline" for the drug addiction plot. 2010 saw Belle and Aden's wedding nominated in the Bride and Doom category at the 2010 All About Soap magazine awards. Belle's funeral episode was nominated for an Australian Writer's Guild Award in 2010. Virgin Media named Belle and Aden as one of "Soaps' sexiest couples", while viewers voted them "Home and Away's Hottest Couple" in a poll run by Holy Soap.

Dom Moran

Dominic "Dom" Moran, played by Sam North, first appeared on 20 April 2006 and departed on 14 February 2008.

Dom works for his uncle Ray (Damien Garvey) at his garage, Moran Motors. He begins playing many dangerous pranks on Ric Dalby (Mark Furze) and often gets him into trouble. Two of these incidents injure Ric, the first; Dom burns Ric with battery acid and in the second, he nearly kills him when he gives Ric a faulty jack which gives way and crushes him. He also begins harassing Ric's girlfriend Belle Taylor (Jessica Tovey) but is kneed in the groin by her and later punched by Ric. Ray then realises that Dom is too dangerous to work with and fires him.

The following year, Dom returns and begins supplying Drew Curtis (Bobby Morley) with illegal parts for his car, dubbed "The Beast" and is involved in the drag-racing scene with local thug, Denni Maitland (Joshua Helman). Denni is involved in a drag race against Drew and Lucas Holden (Rhys Wakefield), which results in Lucas' ex, Lisa Duffy (Jessica McNamee) being killed in a car crash. Dom steals Drew's car and torches it in order to prevent himself from being arrested for theft of the parts. He agrees to help exonerate Drew, now a suspect, if Belle gives him a kiss. Belle reluctantly complies and Dom confesses and is jailed for theft car parts.

Following his release, Dom kidnaps Belle. Drew, acting on a tip from Ray tracks them down and rescues Belle, they flee and hit Dom in the process. However, when they return to the site, Dom has disappeared. He resurfaces several days later in Belle's room and leaves a ring he gave her but leaves. A couple of weeks later, Dom turns up at the diner and collapses.  Belle rushes Dom to hospital and Drew turns up and warns him off. A confrontation results in Dom needing emergency surgery and Belle tells him she loves him but admits to Drew she only did that to get Dom through the surgery. He recovers and begins rehab with the aid of Sam Holden (Jessica Chapnik), his physiotherapist who unwittingly convinces him to continue to pursue Belle. Dom takes a job at the diner and mocks Drew for having to repeat Year 12 when he serves him. Irene Roberts (Lynne McGranger) and Roman Harris (Conrad Coleby) engineer a plan to get Dom away from Belle by arranging for him to have an interview with Irene's daughter, Finlay (Tina Thomsen), who owns a restaurant in the city. However, Dom ruins his chances intentionally and exposed to Belle. He leaves for the city, saying he will return for Belle.

Clayton Smales of The Townsville Bulletin was critical of North's acting. He described North's stint as a "woeful turn" and labelled the character a "flannel-shirted, sparsely bearded Lothario".

Hugh Sullivan

Hugh Sullivan, played by Rodger Corser, made his first appearance on 5 April 2006 and made his last on 12 June 2007. In October 2020, Corser was pictured with Home and Away actors James Stewart and Ditch Davey in Coogee prompting speculation that he was rejoining the show. TV Week's Beth Brennan observed that his character was not killed off, so "the door is still open" for Corser to reprise his role.

Hugh arrives in Summer Bay as a friend and former lover of Rachel Armstrong (Amy Mathews). Rachel invites him to join her and Leah Patterson-Baker (Ada Nicodemou) for lunch at Leah's place. Hugh learns Leah is the midst of a separation from her husband Dan (Tim Campbell) and asks her on a date. Leah is reluctant at first and declines but she agrees later agrees and they share a kiss, which is witnessed by Dan. Hugh leaves after Leah rejects him, admitting that she did not feel that anything was there.

Hugh returns several months later and falls for Rachel, who is now married to Kim Hyde (Chris Hemsworth). He becomes a confidant to Rachel when she and Kim goes through a rough patch in their marriage and even organizes a picnic with him. Rachel sees Hugh flirting with Nurse Julie Cooper (Lisa Hayson-Phillips) and sets them up on a dinner date which proves very uncomfortable for them both. Julie asks Hugh if he still has feelings for Rachel, which he lies and says he does not. Rachel later invites Hugh to stay with her and Kim. When they attend a medical conference together a drunken Rachel tells Hugh she thinks she is more suited to her than Kim is. Hugh, uncomfortable moves out and begins sharing the diner flat with Martha MacKenzie (Jodi Gordon).

On a night out with Kim, Tony Holden (Jon Sivewright) and Ric Dalby (Mark Furze), Hugh meets Ingrid Lynch (Leigh Shorten) and spends the night with her. Rachel is jealous when she finds out but Hugh admits to Ingrid that he is emotionally unavailable. Rachel confronts Hugh about his awkwardness around her and he admits his feelings. She is shocked and was quick to tells him that he is just feeling that way because they used to live together and are still having to work together. Several days later, Hugh invites Rachel to join him for dinner which she accepts but leaves halfway through. She returns after a falling out with Kim and High agrees to let her stay. Hugh and Rachel then share a kiss after he comforts her.

Hugh receives a posting in Johannesburg and tries to keep it a secret, but Julie tells Rachel. He then gives Rachel an ultimatum; he will only stay if they can be together. Hugh gives Rachel some time to think, but leaves for South Africa following her indecisiveness. Several months later, Hugh emails Rachel, who is now engaged to Tony and asks to meet up with her, however, she turns down his offer.

Inside Soap ran a poll asking their readers to decide who Rachel should be with out of Hugh and Kim. The results indicated that they wanted Rachel to be with Hugh – who received fifty-seven percent of the vote.

Macca MacKenzie

Michael "Macca" MacKenzie, played by Trent Baines, first appeared during the episode airing on 7 April 2006 and departed on 23 February 2007.

Macca's main storyline focuses on his relationship with Cassie Turner (Sharni Vinson) and repeated domestic abuse of her. Baines spoke about the story on the serial's official website: "It’s something that happens in society and it’s a shame and any of the girls who are out there I think they need to talk to somebody even if it’s not a friend or a family – possibly counselling or something like that – because I think that they might get stuck into the little world that gets created in a violent relationship." He added "I’ve learnt since playing the role of Macca that it’s a strange way of thinking, I can understand to an extent how it happens, but I certainly think that people in that situation have got some issues and I’ve got no cure for it. I wish I could say that all they need to do is 'this' and that will fix it, but I don't know."

Macca arrives in Summer Bay and almost collides with Belle Taylor (Jessica Tovey), who has taken Kim Hyde's (Chris Hemsworth) car. Martha MacKenzie (Jodi Gordon), Ric Dalby (Mark Furze) and Barry Hyde (Ivar Kants) go to investigate and Martha introduces Macca as her brother. Macca attends Martha's birthday party and soon makes friends with Cassie and begins helping her with boxing training. Martha has reservations about Macca dating Cassie as he had a tendency in the past to reject girls phone calls after getting bored with them. He receives an offer for a courier's job and plans to tell Cassie he is leaving but is afraid to tell her after she confesses her love for him. Macca then leaves and makes a promise to make their long-distance relationship work. He returns several weeks earlier and begins renting the flat above the Beachside diner. The hours his job demands take their toll on him and he turns to drugs. Ric discovers Macca's drug use and confronts him about it. He explains that a lot of other people at work do it and to prove a point, he flushes the drugs but calls for replacements several hours later. Cassie also discovers Macca's habit and confronts him and is hit as a result. He apologises to Cassie but continues hitting her and eventually injures her when he becomes jealous of her closeness with Ric.

The abuse escalates and Cassie tries to leave Macca. After Sally Fletcher (Kate Ritchie) confronts him and orders him to stay away from Cassie, He hands himself in to the police and gets help. Martha bans him from her wedding to Jack but he turns up outside the venue. When an explosion occurs, Macca races into help Martha and Tony get an injured Jack to safety but is crushed by a falling beam. Cassie stands by his side until he is taken to hospital. He discharges himself when Martha and several others are missing when their helicopter crashes and joins the search. Macca saves Ric from a fall, and despite being injured pulls him to safety. He leaves after the group are found.

Macca returns several months later and tells Cassie he has finished his counselling. Cassie and Macca are drawn back together, despite Cassie having reconciled with Ric several months earlier and begin an affair. Ric discovers the affair and attacks Macca. Sally and Alf Stewart (Ray Meagher) quickly break up the fight. Macca is then evicted from the caravan park. He begins staying with Amanda Vale (Holly Brisley) who kisses him but he rejects her. Macca's company offer him a desk job in the city and Cassie agrees to join him despite Sally's protest. The move does not last as Cassie is drawn back to the bay due to Sally being stabbed and Ric being arrested for the murder of Rocco Cooper (Ian Meadows). Macca tries to get Cassie to return with him but she will not and he hits her again. He is disgusted with himself and hands himself in to the police once more.

Drew Curtis

Drew Curtis was played by Bobby Morley. He made his first on-screen appearance on 7 July 2006 and departed on 21 March 2008. Prior to joining the serial, Morley appeared in a production  Angels with Dirty Faces, and was spotted by the Home and Away casting agents who asked him to come in and have a chat. The chance to audition for Drew came up and Morley was cast in the role, despite being older than the character. Morley relocated from Melbourne to Sydney for the show and he admitted that he was quite nervous during his first six weeks on set and that he had to get used to the fast speed at which they shoot scenes. Morley quit Home and Away at the end of 2007. Morley told The Daily Telegraph that he often had to take his shirt off for scenes and that he was treated like a "meat puppet" on the show. The official Home and Away website described Drew as "brooding" and having a "chip on his shoulder the size of Queensland."
For his portrayal of Drew, Morley was nominated for the "Most Popular New Male Talent" Logie Award in 2007. Scott Ellis of The Sun-Herald branded Drew a "teenage tearaway." While Paul Kalina of The Age called him a "bad-boy heart-throb."

Brad Armstrong

Bradley "Brad" Armstrong, played by Chris Sadrinna, made his first appearance on 11 July 2006 and departed on 13 November 2007. Shortly before he arrived, an Inside Soap reporter stated that Brad would help ease Sally Fletcher's (Kate Ritchie) pain over the death of her husband, Flynn Saunders (Joel McIlroy). A spokesperson from the show revealed "Sally's due a bit of good luck. Brad's a nice guy, but he has his fair share of problems – which develop when his mother is killed in tragic circumstances. But he and Sally will draw strength from each other."

Brad arrives in Summer Bay following the death of his mother Elaine (Julie Hudspeth). Sally Fletcher arrives to find Brad in Leah Patterson-Baker's (Ada Nicodemou) house naked. Brad tries to help his sister Rachel (Amy Mathews) with her grief and organises Elaine's funeral. When Brad is locked out, Sally finds him naked again. Brad later saves her from a burning building. Emily Vincent (Libby Richmond), Brad's girlfriend arrives and they get married on the beach in a small ceremony but she dies of leukaemia, leaving him devastated. Brad and Sally grow closer, as she had lost her husband Flynn Saunders several months earlier. When Rocco Cooper (Ian Meadows) enrols at Summer Bay High, Brad is reluctant to give him a chance but Sally is willing. Rocco's brother, Johnny (Callan Mulvey) arrives and angers Brad. At Christmas. Brad and Sally share a kiss under the mistletoe and plan to have dinner together, but Sally does not arrive but is found bleeding outside of the school after being stabbed by Rocco on Johnny's orders. Sally recovers and she and Brad's bond strengthens when he moves in with her.

Naomi Preston (Tiffany Preece) arrives and Brad discovers her relationship with Lucas Holden (Rhys Wakefield). Naomi twists the story to make it look like Brad had knowledge of the relationship before she began teaching at the school. Brad is later stood down as principal but things look up when Sally accepts his marriage proposal. On the day of the wedding, Sally jilts Brad, leaving him hurt and he moves out. While on a boat trip with Alf Stewart (Ray Meagher), Ric Dalby (Mark Furze), Dan Baker (Tim Campbell) and Jack Holden (Paul O'Brien), a storm occurs and the men are lost at sea but return safely. Brad and Rachel later learn their father Robert (John Gregg) had an affair with Heather McCabe (Olivia Pigeot), resulting in a daughter, Tamsyn (Gabrielle Scollay), their half-sister. Heather leaves Tam with Rachel and Brad to attend a gambling rehab programme. They struggle to look after to Tam, as she defies Rachel's authority. Brad takes sole care of Tam but due to her behaviour he loses out on a job at Yabbie Creek High. He supports Sally when her daughter Pippa is hit by Alf's Ute. Heather returns and Brad decides to move to Tasmania and invites her and Tam to come with him and they accept.

For his portrayal of Brad, Sadrinna was nominated for Best Newcomer at the 2007 Inside Soap Awards Sadrinna and co-star Ritchie were also nominated for "Best Couple". The episode featuring Sally standing Brad up on their wedding day earned the episode's writer Margaret Wilson an Australian Writer's Guild award in 2008. The episode in which Brad becomes lost at sea earned a nomination in the category of "Best Single Episode" at the 2008 Digital Spy Soap Awards.

Rocco Cooper

Rocco Cooper, played by Ian Meadows, made his first appearance on 11 October 2006 and departed on 6 February 2007.

Rocco transfers to Summer Bay High when Sally Fletcher (Kate Ritchie) authorizes the move, overruling her boss, principal Brad Armstrong (Chris Sadrinna) who is concerned as Rocco is a former gang member. Sally convinces Brad that Rocco deserves a second chance. Rocco impress them with hard work and dedication and Sally later offers him a place to live after discovering where he is living.

Johnny (Callan Mulvey), Rocco's older brother confronts him about leaving gang life behind and insists he cannot back out his activities and threatens him with death. Rocco then provides an alibi for Johnny when he ransacks Brad's flat. The brothers commit further crimes but Rocco turns Johnny in to the police after staging a robbery on a Credit Union. After Johnny is arrested, Rocco visits him in prison and is ordered by Johnny to kill Sally or be killed himself. Racked with guilt, Rocco stabs Sally and leaves her for dead.

Sally survives the attack and Johnny is furious and threatens Rocco once more. Sally then remembers that Rocco stabbed her and her foster son, Ric Dalby (Mark Furze) is furious and confronts Rocco. Fearing for his life, Rocco contacts Johnny for help and arranges for him to stay at a safehouse. After getting the address from Johnny, Ric arrives only to find Rocco badly beaten. After several days in a coma, Rocco dies from his injuries. He is later buried in an unmarked grave with only Sally, Brad and Johnny (under police guard) attending. Ric is arrested and jailed for Rocco's murder but is released when Johnny is revealed to have arranged the murder.

The storyline involving Rocco stabbing Sally was nominated for "Best Storyline" at the 2007 Inside Soap Awards.

Sam Holden

Sam Holden, played by Jessica Chapnik, made her first on-screen appearance on 17 October 2006. Chapnik secured the role of Sam by chance. In 2008, Chapnik quit the serial to pursue a career in the United States. She described Sam as an interesting character to play because she was "full of self-loathing and was so misunderstood". Sam was "doomed to fail from the beginning" and her "decline made sense" because she was always "quite tragic". Sam's "heaviness" made it hard for Chapnik to defend her actions, Chapnik also felt she had never experienced this with any other character. Eleven Magazine opined that Sam caused "quite a bit of chaos in the sleepy town of Summer Bay". Scott Ellis of the Sun-Herald said Sam was like a "murderous psycho".

Johnny Cooper

Johnny Cooper, played by Callan Mulvey, made his first appearance on 19 October and departed on 25 March 2008. For his portrayal of Johnny, Mulvey was nominated in the category of "Best Bad Boy" at the Inside Soap Awards in 2007 and 2008, respectively.

Rory Tolhurst

Rory Holden (né Deeks, previously Tolhurst) made his first appearance on 20 October 2006 departed on 14 April 2008. Ed Willis first played the role in 2006 and Jack Rickard began playing the character on his return in 2007.

Rory is introduced to Jack Holden (Paul O'Brien) a patient of his mother Sam (Jessica Chapnik). They get along well and Jack begins dating Sam shortly after his recovery. The three of them begin living together. On the day of 'Summer Bay Nippers' Carnival', Rory is excited about Jack attending the event but is let down when Jack arrives late. Jack reassures him he will always be there for him. When Sam is kidnapped, Rory suspects something is wrong and tries to find her but is stopped by Jack's father, Tony (Jon Sivewright). Sam is found and she and Rory leave the bay.

Rory and Sam return to Summer Bay shortly after Sam breaks her ankle and Rory is happy to be back in the Bay. While Rory is babysat by Martha MacKenzie (Jodi Gordon) one day, he is kidnapped. The kidnapper is revealed to be his father, Shane Deeks (Mike Duncan) who has escaped from prison with the aid of a female accomplice. The police search for Rory, which results in a high-speed police chase in the river. Shane is killed but Rory is not with him but is found wet and unharmed. Following this, Rory considers Jack his father.

After failing to adjust to Year 5 at Summer Bay Primary, his teachers decide he is an advanced student and he is moved up to Year 7 at the High School. Rory is worried and on his first day several students pick on him but Aden Jefferies (Todd Lasance) sticks up for him in agreement for him switching the ballot papers for the election for the head of the formal committee. Aden wins but Cassie Turner (Sharni Vinson) and Matilda Hunter (Indiana Evans) uncover the truth and Deputy Principal Donald Fisher (Norman Coburn) puts Rory on detention. While on a school trip, Rory and Annie Campbell (Charlotte Best) sneak off during the trip but are left behind. They try walking home and are found by Cassie and Henk Van Minnen (Damian De Montemas), while hitch-hiking.

Jack and Sam get engaged and Rory is overjoyed. They try to keep the news low-key but Rory cannot contain his excitement and tells everybody. Rory writes a paper about Jack when he is set a writing assignment by a hero and is given an A+. To impress his friends, Rory steals Jack's gun and nearly shoots Dr. Lewis Rigg (Luke Carroll) on the beach. Rory is then upset when Martha tells Jack he should not be marrying Sam. He is then rude to her and begins behaving badly. In spite of everything, Rory gives his mother away to marry Jack. The stable family life does not last long when Sam finds herself attacked by Johnny Cooper (Callan Mulvey). Sam later takes Rory to stay with her sister, Britt Grey. Several weeks later Sam dies and Rory blames Jack, and tells him to stay away from Sam's funeral.

For his portrayal of Rory, Willis was nominated for a Digital Spy Award in 2008.

Others

References

External links
Characters and cast at the Official AU Home and Away website
Characters and cast at the Official UK Home and Away website
Characters and cast at the Internet Movie Database

, 2006
, Home and Away